The following is a list of anti-cannabis organizations and campaigns:

Anti-cannabis organizations

Private-sector organizations

 Abbott Laboratories
 American Anti Drug Council
 American Legislative Exchange Council
 Corrections Corporation of America
 Drug Abuse Resistance Education
 Drug Free America Foundation
 Families Anonymous
 Foundation for a Drug-Free World
 The Heritage Foundation
 Insys Therapeutics
 Independent Order of Rechabites
 International Organisation of Good Templars
 Narconon
 National Cannabis Prevention and Information Centre
 National Families in Action
 National Family Partnership
 Pacific Justice Institute
 Partnership for Drug-Free Kids
 Pharmaceutical Research and Manufacturers of America
 Purdue Pharma
 Roman Catholic Archdiocese of Boston
 Smart Approaches to Marijuana
 Straight, Incorporated
 Two Is Enough D.C.
 University of the Philippines Manila
 Wackenhut Corrections
 White Ribbon Association
 Woman's Christian Temperance Union
 Youth Challenge International

Political parties

 American Constitution Party (Colorado)
 American Freedom Party
 Communist Party of the Philippines
 Moderate Party
 National Alliance (United States)
 Prohibition Party

Governmental organizations

 Anti-Narcotics Force
 Campaign Against Marijuana Planting
 Center for Substance Abuse Prevention
 Commission on Narcotic Drugs
 Drug Enforcement Administration
 Federal Drug Control Service of Russia
 High Intensity Drug Trafficking Area
 International Narcotics Control Board
 Israel Anti-Drug Authority
 Main Directorate for Drugs Control
 National Institute on Drug Abuse
 National Marijuana Initiative
 Office of National Drug Control Policy
 Oficina Nacional Antidrogas
 Opioid and Drug Abuse Commission
 Organized Crime Drug Enforcement Task Force
 Philippine Drug Enforcement Agency
 Royal Commission into Drug Trafficking
 United Nations Drug Control Programme

Anti-cannabis campaigns

Public campaigns

 International Day against Drug Abuse and Illicit Trafficking
 Mandatory minimum sentencing
 Operation Green Merchant
 Operation Green Sweep
 Operation Intercept
 Operation Jackpot
 Operation Keymer
 Operation Kruz Control
 Operation Pipe Dreams
 Red Ribbon Week
 Three-strikes, you’re out
 War on drugs
 Washington State anti-cannabis public service announcements
 Zero tolerance

Mass media

 Above the Influence
 Assassin of Youth
 Just Say No
 Marihuana (1936 film)
 National Youth Anti-Drug Media Campaign
 Reefer Madness
 She Shoulda Said No!
 Stoner Sloth
 The Marihuana Story
 This Is Your Brain on Drugs
 Winners Don't Use Drugs

Museums

 Drug Enforcement Administration Museum and Visitors Center

See also

 Drugs controlled by the UK Misuse of Drugs Act
 List of addiction and substance abuse organizations
 List of cannabis seizures
 List of Schedule I drugs (US)

References

Further reading
 "Newest Activist Groups Go Against 'Recreational' Marijuana", Parents Opposed to Pot, February 22, 2017

Cannabis prohibition
Cannabis-related lists
History of drug control
Lists of organizations